Cuba competed at the 2014 Summer Youth Olympics, in Nanjing, China from 16 August to 28 August 2014.

Medalists

Archery

Cuba qualified a female archer from its performance at the 2013 World Archery Youth Championships.

Individual

Team

Boxing

Cuba qualified three boxers based on its performance at the 2014 AIBA Youth World Championships

Boys

Canoeing

Cuba qualified one boat based on its performance at the 2013 World Junior Canoe Sprint and Slalom Championships.

Boys

Judo

Cuba qualified two athletes based on its performance at the 2013 Cadet World Judo Championships.

Individual

Team

Rowing

Cuba qualified one boat based on its performance at the 2013 World Rowing Junior Championships. Later Cuba qualified another boat based on its performance at the Latin American Qualification Regatta.

Qualification Legend: FA=Final A (medal); FB=Final B (non-medal); FC=Final C (non-medal); FD=Final D (non-medal); SA/B=Semifinals A/B; SC/D=Semifinals C/D; R=Repechage

Swimming

Cuba qualified three swimmers.

Boys

Girls

Triathlon

Cuba qualified one athlete based on its performance at the 2014 American Youth Olympic Games Qualifier.

Individual

Relay

References

2014 in Cuban sport
Nations at the 2014 Summer Youth Olympics
Cuba at the Youth Olympics